Qarğabazar is a village in the Fuzuli District of Azerbaijan. It is located in the southern part of Fuzuli city, at the foot of Ilanlidag Mountain (559,7 m), at a height of 460 meters.

History 
The village was occupied by Armenian forces in 1993, during the First Nagorno-Karabakh War and all of its Azerbaijani inhabitants were forced out. Since 1993, the village was administrated as part of Hadrut Province of the breakaway Republic of Artsakh and renamed Ijevanatun. On 20 October 2020 President of Azerbaijan Ilham Aliyev announced that the village had been recaptured.

Notable sites 
 Caravanserai built in 1681.
 Giyas ad-Din Mosque, built in the 17th century.
 There was a Russo-Tatar (Russo-Azerbaijani) primary school in the village during the pre-revolutionary period.

Notable people 
 Gubad Gasimov, music expert, Honorary Art Worker of Azerbaijan
 Bahadur Eyvazov, dermatologist, Honorary Doctor and Honored Science Worker of Azerbaijan
 Sardar Sardarov, architect, Honorary Architect of Azerbaijan
 Bunyad Sardarov (1889–1919), revolutionary

Gallery

References

External links 

 
 Qargabazar, Azerbaijan Page 

Populated places in Fuzuli District